The 1991 Cupa României Final was the 53rd final of Romania's most prestigious cup competition. The final was played at the Stadionul Naţional in Bucharest on 26 June 1991 and was contested between Divizia A winner Universitatea Craiova and FC Bacău. The cup was won by Universitatea Craiova.

Route to the final

Match details

References

External links
 Official site 

Cupa Romaniei Final, 1991
1981
CS Universitatea Craiova matches
FCM Bacău matches
June 1991 sports events in Europe